Venetian Masque is a 1934 adventure novel written by the Anglo-Italian writer Rafael Sabatini.

It is set in the 1790s, around the time of the invasion by Napoleon Bonaparte which led to the fall of the Republic of Venice. The hero is the Vicomte de Saulx, a French aristocrat supposedly guillotined during the French Revolution, who enters the world of espionage in Venice.

References

External links
 

1934 British novels
British adventure novels
English-language novels
Novels by Rafael Sabatini
Novels set in Venice
Novels set in the 18th century
Hutchinson (publisher) books
McClelland & Stewart books